Lampas is a type of luxury fabric with a background weft (a "ground weave") typically in taffeta with supplementary wefts (the "pattern wefts") laid on top and forming a design, sometimes also with a "brocading weft". Lampas is typically woven in silk, and often has gold and silver thread enrichment.

History
Lampas weaves were developed around 1000 CE. Beginning late in the 17th century western lampas production began centered in Lyon, France, where an industry of providing for French and other European courts became centered.

Gallery

References
 Abbott, James A. A Frenchman in Camelot: The Decoration of the Kennedy White House by Stéphane Boudin. Boscobel Restoration Inc.: 1995. .
Colenman, Brian and Dan Mayers. Scalamandre: Luxurious Home Interiors. Gibbs Smith: 2004. .
Jenkins, David. The Cambridge History of Western Textiles. Cambridge University Press: 2003. .

Woven fabrics